Muhammad Auwal Adam also known as  Albani Zaria (27 September 1960 – 1 February 2014) was a Nigerian Islamic scholar who specialized in the field of hadith. Islamic Law, mass communication, telecommunications engineering and ICT. He was a prominent Islamic scholar and the leader of the Salafi movement in Nigeria. He was a tailor at his earlier stage of life of which he usually called himself (specialized tailor). He was the first scholar to ascribe the word "Salafiyah" to the generation of scholars and students of Islamic denomination in Nigeria. Albani was considered by many contemporary Nigerian scholars as the greatest Salafi scholar in Nigeria.

Early life and education 

Albaniy had his origins from Kano State in the Northern Nigeria but was born and bred in Muchia Sabon Gari, Zaria. He had his primary education in the area before he moved to Barewa College. He studied mass communication in Bayero University, Kano. He obtained a degree in information technology from the Federal University of Technology Yola, in Adamawa State. Before his death, he was a postgraduate student at the Department of Electrical Engineering at the ABU Zaria. This is in addition to his study into Islamic sciences especially hadith, having spent decades studying hundreds of books of hadith and teaching the same. His knowledge and authority in Northern Nigeria led him to adopt the nickname of "Albani", after Muhammad Nasiruddin al-Albani. His students, many of whom are erudite scholars now, are spread all over the country, especially the Northern States and particularly from the states of Kaduna, Kano, Katsina, Plateau, Bauchi and other North and Southern Nigeria as well as some Western African countries.

Death 

On Saturday February 1, 2014, Auwal was teaching at his school in Gaskiya layout, Zaria. That evening, he delivered the usual evening tafsir lecture at Markazus-Salafiyya, Maje Road in Tudun Wada, Zaria at about 8:15–9:30 p.m. from the Book of Sahihul Bukhari, in the chapter of Hajj. Afterwards he drove himself and one of his wives and some of his children. He did not like going on convoys and always drove himself. He stopped to shop at a Central Store along the Zaria Gaskiya, about a kilometer away from his home along Gaskiya Layout in Zaria. As he got to Magume junction, the killers overtook him, smashed his windscreen and shot his wife. When Sheikh Albaniy saw this, he came down to confront them and they started shooting wildly. Muhamman Auwal Albaniy Zaria fell reciting Laila ha illallahu.  All through the journey, he was reciting "Laila ha illallahu. Inna lillahi wa'inna ilaihi-raji'unn" (""). The wife and son died on the spot of the shooting while someone who lived close by rushed him to St. Luke Hospital in Wusasa area of Zaria where he was pronounced dead.
Boko Haram leader Abubakar Shekau claimed responsibility for the shooting.

References

1960 births
2014 deaths
Nigerian Sunni Muslims
Nigerian Salafis
People from Zaria
Nigerian scholars
Deaths by firearm in Nigeria
Assassinated Nigerian people